The U.S. Virgin Islands Association Club Championship is the top soccer club competitions running in U.S. Virgin Islands.

Previously, there were two soccer club competitions running in U.S. Virgin Islands: the St Croix Soccer League and the St Thomas League. The champions were then decided in a knockout tournament between the best two teams of each league. 9,000 capacity Lionel Roberts Park is one of the venues.

The winner and the runner-up of the league starts the qualifications for the CONCACAF Champions Cup from the first round of the CFU Club Championship.

The 1999–00 championship was presumably the first time an overall title was played for.

Current Teams - 2019–20

Helenites SC
Prankton SC
Rovers
Unique FC

LRVI FC
New Vibes SC
Raymix SC
Waitikubuli FC
United We Stand FC

Previous winners

Soccer Championship
 1997–98: not played
 1998–99: M.I. Roc Masters defeated Helenites
 1999–00: UWS Upsetters 5–1 Helenites
 2000–01: not played
 2001–02: Haitian Stars 1–0 UWS Upsetters
 2002–03: not played
 2003–04: not played
 2004–05: Positive Vibes 2–0 Helenites
 2005–06: New Vibes 4–2 Positive Vibes
 2006–07: Helenites 1–0 Positive Vibes
 2007–08: Positive Vibes – New Vibes
 2008–09: New Vibes 1–0 Positive Vibes
 2009–10: not played
 2010–11: not played
 2011–12: Helenites 3–3 (5–4 pens) New Vibes
 2012–13: New Vibes 0–0 (aet, 4–3 pens) Positive Vibes
 2013–14: Helenites 3–1 (agg.) Positive Vibes
 2014–15: Helenites 3–1 Raymix
 2015–16: Raymix 3–2 Helenites
 2016–17: Raymix 1–0 Helenites
 2017–18: not played

Premier League
 2018–19: Helenites 2–1 United We Stand
 2019–20: abandoned
 2020–21: not played

Association Club Championship
 2022-23: New Vibes 4-0 United We Stand

2018-19 champions

References
 fedefutbol.net

External links
US Virgin Islands - List of Champions, RSSSF.com

  
Virgin
1
Sports leagues established in 1997
1997 establishments in the United States Virgin Islands